This is a list of Members of Parliament (MPs) elected to the House of Commons of the United Kingdom by Welsh constituencies for the fifty-eighth Parliament of the United Kingdom (2019–present).

It includes both MPs elected at the 2019 general election, held on 12 December 2019, and those subsequently elected in by-elections.

The list is sorted by the name of the MP, and MPs who did not serve throughout the Parliament are italicised. New MPs elected since the general election are noted at the bottom of the page.

Composition

MPs

See also
 2019 United Kingdom general election in Wales
 List of MPs elected in the 2019 United Kingdom general election
 List of MPs for constituencies in England (2019–present)
 List of MPs for constituencies in Northern Ireland (2019–present)
 List of MPs for constituencies in Scotland (2019–present)

Notes

References

Wales
2019
MPs